The 2nd is a 2020 American action film directed by Brian Skiba and starring Ryan Phillippe, Casper Van Dien, Jack Griffo, Lexi Simonsen, Randy Charach, William McNamara, Jacob Grodnik, Richard Burgi, Samaire Armstrong and William Katt. The film was released digitally and on demand on September 1, 2020.

Premise
While picking up his son at his college dorm, Delta Team Leader Vic Davis meets his son's crush Erin Walton, the daughter of a Supreme Court justice. However, Vic notices an unusual number of people on the premises watching Erin closely. When Erin reveals that her driver is not her usual escort, Vic plunges into action to rescue Erin from a kidnapping plot that puts both his and his son's lives in jeopardy.

Cast
 Ryan Phillippe as Major Victor Marvin "Vic" Davis
 Casper Van Dien as CIA Operative Melvin "The Driver" Sampras
 Jack Griffo as Shawn Davis
 William Katt as Bob Jeffers
 Richard Burgi as CIA Director Michael Phillips
 William McNamara as Jalil
 Samaire Armstrong as Olivia Peters
 Jennifer Wenger as Jade
 Lexi Simonsen as Erin Walton
 Jacob Grodnik as Neal
 Randy Charach as Justice Kenneth Walton
 Gene Freeman as Babcock
 Nicole Reddinger as CIA Operative Paula Danson
 James Logan as Sproule
 Chris Jai Alex as USSS Agent John Guillory
 Christopher Troy as Krieg
 Esteban Cueto as Rodriguez

References

External links
 
 

2020 action films
American action films
2020s English-language films
Films about Delta Force
Films about kidnapping in the United States
Films about the Central Intelligence Agency
Films set in Los Angeles
Films set in universities and colleges
Films directed by Brian Skiba
2020s American films
English-language action films